President Trump – The Piers Morgan Interview is a one-off television programme that aired on ITV in the United Kingdom on 28 January 2018. In the programme, presenter Piers Morgan interviewed then-President of the United States Donald Trump. The interview was recorded while Trump was attending the 2018 meeting of the World Economic Forum in Davos, Switzerland, which took place between 22 January and 25 January 2018.	

During the programme, which was watched by 3 million people at 10:00pm (fewer than the number of viewers watching the rival BBC News at Ten), Trump tells Morgan that he would not call himself a feminist, and would have taken a "tougher" approach to Brexit than that of British Prime Minister Theresa May.

References

2018 in British television
2018 television specials
British television talk shows
English-language television shows
Interviews
ITV (TV network) original programming
January 2018 events in the United Kingdom
Television series by ITV Studios
United Kingdom–United States relations
Works about Donald Trump